Seasons of Love is a 2014 Philippine television drama romance anthology broadcast by GMA Network. It premiered on October 6, 2014 on the network's Telebabad line up replacing My BFF. The show concluded on October 30, 2014 with a total of 16 episodes.

Chapters

"My Soulmate, My Soulhate"

"I Do, I Don't"

"First Dance, First Love"

"BF for Hire, GF for Life"

Ratings
According to AGB Nielsen Philippines' Mega Manila household television ratings, the pilot episode of Seasons of Love earned a 16.7% rating. While the final episode scored a 14.7% rating.

References

External links
 

2014 Philippine television series debuts
2014 Philippine television series endings
Filipino-language television shows
GMA Network original programming
Philippine anthology television series
Television shows set in the Philippines